Martynchik or Martinchik is a gender-neutral Slavic surname. Notable people with the surname include:

Svetlana Martynchik (born 1965), Ukrainian fantasy writer
Vadim Martinchik (born 1934), Soviet swimmer 

Slavic-language surnames